All figure skating events in 2002 Winter Olympics were held at the Salt Lake Ice Center.

Medal summary

Medal table

Medalists

Results

Men
Medals awarded Thursday, February 14, 2002

Yagudin received 5.9s and 6.0s for his free skating after World Champion Plushenko had made several errors in both the short program and the free skating.

Referee:
  Sally-Anne Stapleford

Assistant Referee:
  Junko Hiramatsu

Judges:
  Wendy Langton
  Merja Kosonen
  Janet Allen
  Nicolae Bellu
  Yuri Kliushnikov
  Volker Waldeck
  Alexander Penchev
  Mieko Fujimori
  Evgenia Bogdanova
  Jarmila Portová (substitute)

Ladies
Medals awarded Thursday, February 21, 2002

Hughes, fourth after the short program, skated a clean free skating with seven triple jumps, including two triple-triple combinations. Kwan led after the short program but slipped to third after two jumping errors. Sasha Cohen finished fourth, after a fall on the back end of a triple lutz-triple toe combination. Slutskaya became only the second Russian to medal in the ladies' event at the Olympics.

Hughes and Slutskaya finished with tie scores, Hughes winning the gold medal on a tiebreaker for having won the free skating. The Russian officials were very disappointed with the result and filed a protest, which was not accepted by ISU after it examined all results and scores, thus confirming Hughes as the winner.

Referee:
  Britta Lindgren

Assistant Referee:
  Charles Foster

Judges:
  Sissy Krick
  Tatiana Danilenko
  Maria Hrachovcova
  Ingelise Blangsted
  Paolo Pizzocari
  Irina Absaliamova
  Pekka Leskinen
  Deborah Islam
  Joseph Inman
  Vladislav Petukov (substitute)

Pairs
Medals awarded February 11, 2002; second award ceremony February 17.

A controversial decision was taken which extended the Russian dominance of pair skating at the Olympics.

In the first week of the Games, a controversy in the pairs' figure skating competition culminated in the French judge's scores being thrown out and the Canadian team of Jamie Salé and David Pelletier being awarded a gold medal (together with the Russians who were controversially awarded gold previously and kept their medals despite the allegations of vote swapping and buying the votes of the French judge).  Allegations of bribery were leveled against many ice-skating judges, leading to the arrest of known criminal Alimzhan Tokhtakhounov in Italy (at the request of the United States). He was released by the Italian officials.

Judges from Russia, the People's Republic of China, Poland, Ukraine, and France placed the Russians first; judges from the United States, Canada, Germany, and Japan gave the nod to the Canadians. The International Skating Union announced a day after the competition that it would conduct an "internal assessment" into the judging decision. On February 15 the ISU and IOC, in a joint press conference, announced that Marie-Reine Le Gougne, the French judge implicated in collusion, was guilty of misconduct and was suspended effective immediately.

Full results
The following are the final amended results, not the original results.

Referee:
  Ronald Pfenning

Assistant Referee:
  Alexander Lakernik

Judges:
  Marina Sanaya
  Yang Jiasheng
  Lucy Brennan
  Marie-Reine Le Gougne
  Anna Sierocka
  Benoit Lavoie
  Vladislav Petukov
  Sissy Krick
  Hideo Sugita
  Jarmila Portová (substitute)

Ice dance
Medals awarded Monday, February 18, 2002

Russian skater Anissina emigrated to France after Averbukh, her former partner, left her to skate with Lobacheva. It was the first gold in Olympic figure skating for France since 1932.

The first compulsory dance was the Quickstep. The second was Blues.

Full results

Referee:
  Alexander Gorshkov

Assistant Referee:
  Ann Shaw

Judges (CD1):
  Eugenia Gasiorowska
  Irina Nechkina
  Yuri Balkov
  Ingrid Charlotte Wolter
  Evgenia Karnolska
  Alla Shekhovtseva
  Roland Wehinger
  Katalin Alpern
  Halina Gordon-Potorak
  Walter Zuccaro (substitute)

Judges (CD2):
  Alla Shekhovtseva
  Yuri Balkov
  Walter Zuccaro
  Katalin Alpern
  Evgenia Karnolska
  Irina Nechkina
  Halina Gordon-Potorak
  Roland Wehinger
  Ingrid Charlotte Wolter
  Eugenia Gasiorowska (substitute)

Judges (OD):
  Halina Gordon-Potorak
  Walter Zuccaro
  Eugenia Gasiorowska
  Roland Wehinger
  Irina Nechkina
  Katalin Alpern
  Ingrid Charlotte Wolter
  Evgenia Karnolska
  Alla Shekhovtseva
  Yuri Balkov (substitute)

Judges (FD):
  Alla Shekhovtseva
  Roland Wehinger
  Eugenia Gasiorowska
  Ingrid Charlotte Wolter
  Walter Zuccaro
  Irina Nechkina
  Evgenia Karnolska
  Yuri Balkov
  Halina Gordon-Potorak
  Katalin Alpern (substitute)

Participating NOCs
Thirty-one nations competed in the figure skating events at Salt Lake City.

References

External links

 2002 Winter Olympics - Icecalc results page
Official Results Book – Figure skating

 
2002 Winter Olympics events
2002
2002 in figure skating
International figure skating competitions hosted by the United States